Finton House School is a private primary school located in Wandsworth, London, England.

Finton House was founded in 1987 as a charitable trust.

References

External links

Alumni 

 Louis Partridge

1987 establishments in England
Educational institutions established in 1987
Private co-educational schools in London
Private schools in the London Borough of Wandsworth